The Women's rhythmic individual  all-around event took place on 13 October 2010 at the Indira Gandhi Arena.

Final

References
Results

Gymnastics at the 2010 Commonwealth Games
All-around artistic gymnastics
2010 in women's gymnastics